Alexsandar Petrov (born in 1893; died in 1942) was an association football player.

International career
Petrov played his only game for Russia on 5 July 1914 in a friendly against Sweden.

External links
  Profile

1893 births
1942 deaths
Russian footballers
Russia international footballers

Association football forwards
FC Dynamo Moscow players